The men's Greco-Roman 55 kilograms is a competition featured at the 2021 U23 World Wrestling Championships, and was held in Belgrade, Serbia  on 1 and 2 November.

Medalists

Results
Legend
F — Won by fall
WO — Won by walkover

Final

Top half

Bottom half

Repechage

References

External links
Official website

Men's Greco-Roman 55 kg